Philippa of Dreux, Dame de Coucy (1192–1242) was a daughter of Robert II of Dreux and his second wife Yolande de Coucy.

Family 
Philippa was the fifth of seven children born to her parents, Robert II of Dreux and his second wife Yolande de Coucy.

Spouse and children
In 1219 she married Henry II of Bar (1190–1239), the son of Theobald I of Bar.

Children
 Margaret of Bar (1220–1275), in 1240 she married Henry V of Luxembourg
 Thiébaut II of Bar (c. 1221–1291), Succeeded Henry II as Count of Bar.
 Henry of Bar (died 1249)
 Jeanne of Bar (1225–1299), married first Frédéric de Blamont who died in 1255, and later married Louis V, Count of Chiny.
 Renaud of Bar (died 1271)
 Erard of Bar (died 1335)
 Isabelle of Bar (died 1320)

References

Sources
 

1192 births
1242 deaths
12th-century French women
12th-century French people
13th-century French women
13th-century French people